Süsel is a municipality in the district of Ostholstein, in Schleswig-Holstein, Germany. It is situated approximately 23 km north of Lübeck, and 10 km southeast of Eutin. The small lakes Barkauer See and Woltersteich are located here.

References

Ostholstein